Government Science College, Bangalore, is an autonomous general degree college for science located at Nrupathunga Road, Ambedkar Veedhi in Bangalore, Karnataka. It is established in the year 1921. For the academic year 2019–2020, it was affiliated with Bengaluru City University. This college offers different undergraduate and postgraduate courses in science.

Departments

Science

Physics
Chemistry
Mathematics
Statistics
Economics
Electronics
Botany
Zoology
Microbiology
Biotechnology
Genetics
Geology
Computer Science
Biochemistry

Accreditation
The college is  recognized by the University Grants Commission (UGC) and has been awarded College with Potential for Excellence - CPE status for the second time. During the third cycle of NAAC accreditation, the college has been awarded A++ with a CGPA of 3.54. The college is recognised by DST - FIST.

References

External links
http://www.gscblr.kar.nic.in/

Educational institutions established in 1921
1921 establishments in India
Colleges affiliated to Bangalore University
Colleges in Bangalore